Richárd Bicskey (4 October 1936 – 21 June 2020) was a Hungarian cyclist. He competed in the men's sprint and men's tandem events at the 1964 Summer Olympics.

References

1936 births
2020 deaths
Hungarian male cyclists
Olympic cyclists of Hungary
Cyclists at the 1964 Summer Olympics
Cyclists from Budapest